Neil Pringle (born 20 July 1952) is an Australian former professional rugby league footballer who played in the 1970s.

Career
Pringle was a Newtown junior that was graded from their Presidents Cup team as a 15-year-old in 1967. He was playing first grade as a 20-year-old, and stayed with the Newtown club until the end of the 1974 NSWRFL season. 

He moved to Balmain in 1975 and stayed there until his retirement from Sydney football at the conclusion of the 1982 season. During his Balmain years, Pringle is remembered for his brilliant combination with the international and fellow Balmain forward, Brian Lockwood.

Pringle finished his career as captain-coach of Cessnock Goannas.

References

1952 births
Living people
Australian rugby league players
Balmain Tigers players
Cessnock Goannas players
Newtown Jets players
New South Wales rugby league team players
City New South Wales rugby league team players
Rugby league locks
Place of birth missing (living people)